Yevgeni Valeryevich Alkhimov (born 11 February 1977) is a Russian professional football official and a former player. He is the director of sports for FC Ural Yekaterinburg, where he played from 2006 to 2008.

Playing career

He made his debut in the Russian Premier League in 2001 for FC Fakel Voronezh.

He is the best Russian Football National League scorer ever.

Honours
Russian First Division top scorer: 2005 (24 goals), 2006 (25 goals).

References

1977 births
Living people
People from Chita, Zabaykalsky Krai
Russian footballers
Association football forwards
FC Fakel Voronezh players
FC Ural Yekaterinburg players
FC Salyut Belgorod players
Russian Premier League players
FC Volgar Astrakhan players
FC Sokol Saratov players
FC SKA-Khabarovsk players
FC Chita players
Sportspeople from Zabaykalsky Krai